The 2022–23 Verbandspokal (English: 2022–24 Association Cup) consists of twenty-one regional cup competitions, the Verbandspokale, the qualifying competition for the 2023–24 DFB-Pokal, the German Cup.

All clubs from the 3. Liga and below can enter the regional Verbandspokale, subject to the rules and regulations of each region. Clubs from the Bundesliga and 2. Bundesliga do not enter but were instead directly qualified for the first round of the DFB-Pokal. Reserve teams are not permitted to take part in the DFB-Pokal or the Verbandspokale. The precise rules of each regional Verbandspokal are laid down by the regional football association organising it.

All twenty-one winners qualify for the first round of the German Cup in the following season. Three additional clubs also qualify for the first round of the German Cup, these being from the three largest state associations, Bavaria, Westphalia and Lower Saxony. The Lower Saxony Cup is split into two paths, one for teams from the 3. Liga and the Regionalliga Nord and one for the teams from lower leagues. The winners of both paths qualify for the DFB-Pokal. In Bavaria the best-placed non-reserve Regionalliga Bayern team qualifies for the DFB-Pokal while in Westphalia the spot will alternate between the Oberliga Westfalen champion and best-placed Westphalian team from the Regionalliga West. This year, the Regionalliga West champion qualifies.

The finals of the Verbandspokal competitions will be played on the Amateurs' Final Day, on 3 June 2023.

Competitions
The finals of the 2022–23 Verbandspokal competitions (winners listed in bold):

Notes

References

External links
Official DFB website : The German Football Association
Fussball.de : Official results website of the DFB

2022–23 in German football cups
Verbandspokal seasons